A primate is any member of the biological order of Primates, including monkeys, apes, and humans.

Primate may also refer to:

People
 Primate (bishop), a title/rank bestowed on (arch)bishops within some Christian churches
 Primates (journal), a scientific journal
 Prince primate, a title formerly given in German and Hungarian nations
Primates or Kodjabashis, local Christian notables in parts of Ottoman Greece, especially the Peloponnese

Geography
 Primate's Palace, a palace in Slovakia
 Primate, Saskatchewan, a former village in Canada

Others
 Primate, a 1974 documentary by Frederick Wiseman

See also
 Primate city